TradFest Temple Bar is an annual music and culture festival that takes place in late January in Dublin, Ireland. Founded by the Temple Bar Company, a not-for-profit organisation who work on behalf of businesses in the cultural quarter of Temple Bar, Dublin, it celebrates traditional Irish and folk music and cultural offerings and was launched in 2005.
One of the few independent events of its type in Ireland, it has become a major draw for international audiences travelling from the US, UK and Europe - attracting almost 25,000 visitors in 2017. Ticket prices are kept to a minimum price to ensure value for money for those attending. 
The festival has established its reputation by attracting some of the biggest names internationally in folk and traditional Irish music such as Billy Bragg, Donovan, Mary Chapin Carpenter, Martin Carthy, Maria McKee, Fairport Convention, Eddi Reader, Sarah Jarosz, Ralph McTell, Gilbert O’Sullivan, Steeleye Span and Levellers. Notable Irish acts who have performed include Glen Hansard, Aoife O’Donovan, Damien Dempsey, Declan O’Rourke, Paul Brady, Mundy, Mick Flannery, Maura O’Connell, Finbar Furey, The Dublin Legends, Clannad, Altan, Beoga, Martin Hayes, Kila and Stockton's Wing.

The 2022 edition of the festival will take place from 26 to 30 January.

History
Since its inception in 2005 by the Temple Bar Company, TradFest Temple Bar has expanded its offering to reflect its ethos of ‘Trad without Frontiers’. This allows for an elaborate and varied line-up at each festival that incorporates myriad musical forms including Celtic folk, folk, folk rock, nu folk, world music and traditional Irish music. The incentive was to provide a musical interlude for Irish and international visitors in January, a month hitherto devoid of any festival events. The location, Temple Bar, is a small area in Dublin's City Centre and is known as the capital's Cultural Quarter because of its abundance of public houses, street entertainment, art galleries and photography gallery.

Former Minister for Environment Noel Dempsey is Chairman of the Temple Bar Company. Martin Harte is the company's CEO and oversees the organisation of TradFest Temple Bar annually. Stephen Rea is a patron of the festival. The programme director is Kieran Hanrahan, an Irish radio host and musician who presents Ceílí House, a weekly show on RTÉ Radio 1.

Since it formed TradFest uses some of Dublin's landmark buildings to host its concerts. This allows the event to maintain an independence in the way it is organised and the low price of tickets sales. Venues include City Hall; The House of Lords ; St Michan's  ; St Werburgh's ; St Patrick's Cathedral; National Stadium and Christ Church Cathedral.

Festival highlights
The festival prides itself on the promotion and support of new and up-and-coming acts as well as established names in the world of folk and traditional Irish music.
Several events have played a part in TradFest Temple Bar reaching a wider international audience. The Kilfenora Céilí Band performed a free concert on top of the hotel belonging to U2, The Clarence Hotel - the same venue where the band performed to promote their song, "Beautiful Day". Beoga did a naked photo shoot for the festival before going on to fame for their part in Ed Sheeran's "Galway Girl" and performing on the Pyramid Stage at Glastonbury in 2017.

Notable concerts include a Clannad reunion at Christ Church Cathedral in 2011 and The Dubliners celebrating their 50th anniversary at the same venue in 2012, just three months before Barney McKenna passed away. The festival has always supported contemporary commissions including two by renowned composer Lorcan Mac Mathuna to celebrate the Battle of Clontarf and the 1916 Rising. T With The Maggies (featuring Moya Brennan, Mairéad Ní­ Mhaonaigh, Tríona Ní Dhomhnaill and Maighread Ní Dhomhnaill) first came together at the 2009 festival at the suggestion of their respective children and went on to perform at the Irish Global Economic summit that year. They were subsequently commissioned to record the folk song "Two Sisters" by Sam Shepard for his play Ages of the Moon, which opened in New York and Dublin, starring actors Sean McGinley and festival patron Stephen Rea. New works by Declan O’Rourke and Miles Duggan were showcased in 2014.

2021 - Virtual TradFest 
Due to the COVID-19 pandemic, the 2021 festival was unable to take place. It was replaced by an online version, filmed at Dublin Castle and featuring a number of high-profile Irish artists.

Key artists at TradFest Temple Bar
Afro Celt Sound System, Altan, Andy Irvine & Donal Lunny, Aoife O'Donovan, Barbara Dickson, Bellowhead, Beoga, Big Country, Billy Bragg, Caoimhín Ó Raghallaigh, Cara Dillon, Carlos Núñez Muñoz, Cathy Davey, Cherish the Ladies, Clannad, Damien Dempsey, Danu, Declan O'Rourke, Declan Sinnott, Dervish, Dhol Foundation, Dick Gaughan, Donovan, Dougie MacLean, Duke Special, Eddi Reader, Eleanor McEvoy, Fairport Convention, Finbar Furey, Frances Black, Frankie Gavin, Gilbert O'Sullivan, Glen Hansard, Hazel O'Connor, Hothouse Flowers, Iarla O’Lionaird, In Tua Nua, Judy Collins, Julie Fowlis, Kathryn Roberts & Sean Lakeman, Kíla, Lankum, Loah, Levellers, Luka Bloom, Lúnasa, Maria McKee, Martin Carthy & Eliza Carthy, Martin Hayes, Maura O'Connell, Mick Flannery, Mundy,  Oysterband, Paddy Keenan, Paul Brady, Ralph McTell, Sarah Jarosz, Seth Lakeman, Sharon Shannon, Steeleye Span, Stephen James Smith, Stockton's Wing, Sweeney's Men, Teddy Thompson, T with the Maggies, The Dubliners, The Fureys, The Undertones, The Young ‘Uns, Turin Brakes

Sponsors
Temple Bar Company
The Department of Tourism, Culture, Arts, Gaeltach, Sport and Media
Dublin City Council
Diageo
Fáilte Ireland
Tourism Ireland
Office of Public Works
RTÉ Supporting the Arts
Culture Ireland
Irish Music Magazine

References

External links
 tradfest.ie 

Folk festivals in Ireland
Recurring events established in 2006